Kionophyton is a genus of flowering plants from the orchid family, Orchidaceae. It contains 3 known species, native to Mexico and Guatemala.

Kionophyton pollardianum Szlach., Rutk. & Mytnik - Oaxaca
Kionophyton sawyeri (Standl. & L.O.Williams) Garay - Morelos
Kionophyton seminuda (Schltr.) Garay - widespread from central Mexico to Guatemala

See also 
 List of Orchidaceae genera

References 

  (2003) Genera Orchidacearum 3: 215 ff. Oxford University Press.
  2005. Handbuch der Orchideen-Namen. Dictionary of Orchid Names. Dizionario dei nomi delle orchidee. Ulmer, Stuttgart

External links 

Cranichideae genera
Spiranthinae